Edgewood is a historic home located at Frederick, Frederick County, Maryland, United States. It is a two-story multipart limestone farmhouse featuring narrow courses of native stone. The house was constructed and added to over the 18th and 19th century and reflects the Greek Revival style popular at that time. It is associated with the Schley family, prominent 19th century residents of Frederick County, who held the farm from 1830 until 1911.

Edgewood was listed on the National Register of Historic Places in 1979. It was destroyed by fire in 2010 and has been delisted from the register.

References

External links
, including photo in 2004, at Maryland Historical Trust

Greek Revival houses in Maryland
Houses in Frederick County, Maryland
Houses on the National Register of Historic Places in Maryland
National Register of Historic Places in Frederick County, Maryland
Former National Register of Historic Places in Maryland